Obed Ulises Estrada Mora (born July 31, 1994, in Guadalajara, Jalisco) is a Mexican professional footballer who plays for Gavilanes de Matamoros.

External links

1994 births
Living people
Mexican footballers
Association football forwards
Leones Negros UdeG footballers
Loros UdeC footballers
Gavilanes de Matamoros footballers
Ascenso MX players
Liga Premier de México players
Tercera División de México players
Footballers from Guadalajara, Jalisco